Pen-y-garn may refer to:

Pen y Garn - a mountain in Ceredigion
Penygarn, Torfaen - a village in Torfaen, in the ward of St Cadocs/Penygarn, Wales
Pen-y-garn, Ceredigion - a village in Ceredigion, Wales
Pen-y-garn - a former farm  near Llanpumsaint, Carmarthenshire, Wales, now part of the area known as Skanda Vale